Martin Serafimov (born 3 March 2000) is a Macedonian handball player for RK Alkaloid and the Macedonian national team.

He represented Macedonia at the 2019 World Men's Handball Championship.

References

2000 births
Living people
Macedonian male handball players
Sportspeople from Skopje
Mediterranean Games competitors for North Macedonia
Competitors at the 2022 Mediterranean Games